Fulton is a rural unincorporated community in Lauderdale County, Tennessee, United States. Founded in 1827, Fulton is the oldest settlement in Lauderdale County.

History
In the following two years, the population rose to 600. Around 1830, after a deadly fever struck the community and killed 200, the remainder of the population moved away; no inhabitants remained by 1832. It was re-surveyed and re-founded in 1835.

Economy

After the abolition of slavery, sharecropping was the primary means of income for low income families in the area. Mostly for the cultivation of cotton, land would be used by sharecroppers in return for a share of the crop to the landowner. Modern machines such as the cotton picker have made the manual cultivation obsolete over time as they took over the work from manual laborers.

As of 2008, there were no industries in Fulton.

Geography
Fulton is at coordinates . Fulton is situated on the southeastern edge of the New Madrid Seismic Zone, an area with a high earthquake risk. Tennessee State Route 87 and Tennessee State Route 207 both pass through Fulton.

See also
 Battle of Fort Pillow

References

Unincorporated communities in Lauderdale County, Tennessee
Unincorporated communities in Tennessee